Lizzie Frost Rattray (née Fenton, 22 March 1855 – 12 August 1931) was a New Zealand journalist, suffragist and welfare worker.

Life
Rattray was born on 22 March 1855 in Dunedin, Otago, New Zealand to Mary Lister and Archdeacon John Albert Fenton. Her family returned to Europe for the children's education. After their return to New Zealand Lizzie married William Rattray a prosperous Auckland draper. After initial interest in charity work for the St John Ambulance, Lizzie moved on to suffrage and other feminist causes, using her position as a journalist to get her message heard. Writing for the Gentlewoman and the New Zealand Graphic she wrote about employment, education and the franchise. She was elected to the Women's Franchise League and instrumental in opening membership to men.

Rattray died on 12 August 1931 in Parnell, New Zealand.

Legacy
Rattray appears in a 1993 suffrage mural created to celebrate 100 years of women having the vote in New Zealand.

References

1855 births
1931 deaths
New Zealand journalists
New Zealand suffragists
Writers from Dunedin
20th-century New Zealand women writers
New Zealand women journalists